Michel Ravarino (23 January 1906 – 18 September 1988) was a Monegasque sports shooter. He competed at the 1936, 1948 and 1960 Summer Olympics.

He was also an architect, with his work being part of the architecture event in the art competition at the 1928 Summer Olympics.

References

1906 births
1988 deaths
Monegasque male sport shooters
Olympic shooters of Monaco
Shooters at the 1936 Summer Olympics
Shooters at the 1948 Summer Olympics
Shooters at the 1960 Summer Olympics
Olympic competitors in art competitions
Monegasque architects